In mathematics, specifically complex analysis, the principal values of a multivalued function are the values along one chosen branch of that function, so that it is single-valued. A simple case arises in taking the square root of a positive real number. For example, 4 has two square roots: 2 and −2; of these the positive root, 2, is considered the principal root and is denoted as

Motivation
Consider the complex logarithm function . It is defined as the complex number  such that

Now, for example, say we wish to find . This means we want to solve
 
The value  is a solution.

We can rotate counterclockwise  radians from 1 to reach  initially, but if we rotate further another  we reach  again.

But this has a consequence that may be surprising in comparison of real valued functions:  does not have one definite value. For , we have

for an integer , where  is the (principal) argument of  defined to lie in the interval . As the principal argument is unique for a given complex number ,  is not included in the interval.  Each value of  determines what is known as a branch (or sheet), a single-valued component of the multiple-valued log function.

General case

Principal values of standard functions
Complex valued elementary functions can be multiple-valued over some domains. The principal value of some of these functions can be obtained by decomposing the function into simpler ones whereby the principal value of the simple functions are straightforward to obtain.

Logarithm function
We have examined the logarithm function above, i.e., 

Now,  is intrinsically multivalued.

Square root
For a complex number  the principal value of the square root is:

with argument

Complex argument

The principal value of complex number argument measured in radians can be defined as:
 values in the range 
 values in the range 

To compute these values one can use functions :
 atan2 with principal value in  the range 
 atan  with principal value in  the range

See also
Principal branch
Branch point

References

Complex analysis